Geoff Keighley is a Canadian video game journalist and television presenter. He was most known for hosting the video game show GameTrailers TV, and for co-hosting the now-defunct G4tv.com. Keighley is also a freelance writer whose work has appeared in Kotaku, among other publications. Keighley was the executive producer of the Spike Video Game Awards, and has served as the executive producer and host of The Game Awards since its inaugural show in 2014. He has also hosted the E3 Coliseum event at the Electronic Entertainment Expo.

Career

Early career
Keighley was born in 1978 and grew up in suburban Toronto. Both of Keighley's parents were executives at IMAX (and remain there as of 2022), which came with membership in the Academy of Motion Picture Arts and Sciences. Through his parents, he gained an appreciation of the Oscars and awards shows in general. He and his younger brother were exposed to computers and video games at a young age, both becoming fans of the medium. As a teenager, Keighley started GameSlice in 1996, a website for game reviews and journalism.

Keighley's foray into video game reporting and presentation had been through Cybermania '94: The Ultimate Games Awards, the first video game awards show broadcast on television. Keighley was fourteen at the time, but, though his father's connections, was brought in to help write lines for the celebrity hosts to read. The show was not considered successful, aimed more for comedy than celebration, but from it, Keighley was inspired to develop some type of equivalent of the Academy Awards for video games in his career.

Keighley entered into the University of Southern California in 1997 to obtain a business degree. During that time, he pitched to GameStop a series of long-form articles to delve into the development of some popular games, inspired by VH1's Behind the Music. His first such work was "Blinded by Reality: The True Story Behind the Creation of Unreal", covering the development of Unreal. He had been able to get access to some of the behind the scenes at Epic Games as he had been friends with Epic's co-founder Mark Rein during his youth in Toronto. Other such works Keighley wrote for GameSpot included deep dives into the development of Daikatana and Metal Gear Solid 2. Through these reports, Keighley gained numerous contacts with development studios, including open access to Valve. Following his business degree, Keighly entered into law school, inspired by a Time reporter suggesting he write in the crossover area of business and video games. Around this time in 2002, Keighley also began writing articles for Entertainment Weekly and Fortune, and was also brought as a co-host of The Electric Playground alongside Tommy Tallarico by the show's creator Victor Lucas.

Television appearances
Spike TV brought on Keighley to host his own show, GameTrailers TV with Geoff Keighley in 2003. He was also involved in other video game-related projects on television. On Comcast's G4 network, he appeared as the network's lead anchor for its E3 press conference coverage, interviewing CEOs from companies like Sony and Electronic Arts. For MTV he created the concept and produced (with LivePlanet) "Gears of War: Race to E3" and "Gears of War: Race to Launch", two specials that took viewers inside the development of the hit Xbox 360 game from Microsoft. And in 2007, the Discovery Channel aired a five-hour documentary on releases including those of such companies as World of Wonder Productions, based on a treatment by Keighley, who also served as consulting producer.  Geoff has also hosted and co-produced a number of video game launch specials for Spike TV, including "Madden NFL 08 Kickoff" featuring a performance by Ozzy Osbourne and "Halo 3: Launched!" featuring a performance by Linkin Park. He was also interviewed on what became a controversial Fox News segment on Mass Effect, and was later praised by gamers online for being the only one on the show who had actually played the game.

Keighley had also come under some negative perception by gamers in 2012 after he was presenting information about Halo 4 while sitting among stands advertising Mountain Dew and Doritos products. Several people critiqued this presentation as a sign of a lack of journalism standards, and the scenario became known as "Doritosgate" within the gaming community while Keighley was derogatorly called "Doritos Pope". Eurogamer's Robert Florence criticized Keighley's presentation and the state of game journalism at that time: "Geoff Keighley is often described as an industry leader. A games expert. He is one of the most prominent games journalists in the world. And there he sits, right there, beside a table of snacks. He will be sitting there forever, in our minds. That's what he is now. And in a sense, it is what he always was." The event led to Keighley reviewing his current career.

Keighley was invited by the producers of Spike's Video Game Awards program to help with the programming from 2006 onward. In 2013, Spike changed the format of the show and rebranded the awards as the VGX Awards. To Keighley, the format became more commercial and promotional rather than a celebration of video game achievements, and coupled with the ridicule he faced from Doritosgate in 2012, he opted to leave the show.

The Game Awards

Through 2014, he funded his own efforts to put together a new awards show, gaining the support of Microsoft, Sony, and Nintendo as well as major publications and industry leaders. Keighley thus established The Game Awards which were first presented in December 2014, and which Keighley remains the primary host.

In December 2016, Keighley was picked as a judge for the Viveport Developer Awards (VDAs).

Keighley had been a participant of E3, the annual video game trade show, since its start, and starting in E3 2017, Keighley had arranged and hosted the E3 Coliseum, a live-streaming event running over the course of E3 that brought in developers and publishers at E3 for interviews and other discussions. However, with the Entertainment Software Association making significant changes to the format of E3 2020 (prior to its cancellation due to the COVID-19 pandemic), Keighley stated he will not be organizing an E3 Coliseum event nor attending the show for the first time in 25 years.

With E3's cancellation among other several other trade shows and events like Gamescom from the pandemic, Keighley worked with several major publishers and video game industry leaders to launch the first Summer Game Fest from May to August 2020. During this period, Keighley helped developers and publishers present game announcements and other presentations, along with Steam and Xbox to provide game demos during this period. Summer Games Fest was also held in 2021 and 2022 as a virtual event with plans to expand to an inperson event in 2023 which will place in direct competition with E3.

Ongoing journalism
Keighley's GameSpot articles since evolved into a series of articles "The Final Hours", where he has in-depth access to the various studios near the end of a development period and write in depth about the process as the game is nearing completion. In more recent years, these articles are released as mobile apps. In a July 2008 interview on The Jace Hall Show, Keighley spoke about the importance of this process, stating "There's such a lack of investigative journalism. I wish I had more time to do more, sort of, investigation. Really dig into some of these bigger issues, so I could look at like, the 'Red Ring of Death' problem. That's never really been properly reported about, like what really happens."

Other appearances
Keighley appeared as a holographic character in the game Death Stranding. A mask of Geoff Keighley's face was also added to the video game Among Us. In August 2021, Geoff Keighley was cast as Uncle Theodore in Muppets Haunted Mansion. Keighley also had a brief cameo role in The Matrix Resurrections, as a game awards presenter.

Works

References

External links
Official website

1979 births
Canadian bloggers
Canadian television personalities
Living people
People in the video game industry
Video game critics
The Game Awards
Canadian documentary film producers
Canadian television hosts